Live at Fat Tuesdays is a live album by pianist Kenny Barron that was recorded in 1988 and released on the German Enja label.

Reception 

In his review on Allmusic, Ron Wynn noted: "Barron stretches out and plays both flashy and easy, hot and cool, on this '88 set cut at Fat Tuesday's in New York."

Track listing 
All compositions by Kenny Barron except where noted.

 "There Is No Greater Love" (Isham Jones, Marty Symes) – 8:34
 "Misterioso" (Thelonious Monk) – 7:18
 "Lunacy" – 8:24
 "Sand Dune" – 12:14
 "518" – 10:02
 "Something for Ramone" (John Stubblefield) – 11:18 Bonus track on CD
 "Dreams" (Eddie Henderson) – 12:11 Bonus track on CD

Personnel 
Kenny Barron – piano
Eddie Henderson – trumpet (tracks 1 & 3–7)
John Stubblefield – tenor saxophone (tracks 1 & 3–7) 
Cecil McBee – bass (tracks 1 & 3–7)
Victor Lewis – drums (tracks 1 & 3–7)

References 

Kenny Barron live albums
1988 live albums
Enja Records live albums